Havana is an unincorporated community in Havana Township, Steele County, Minnesota, United States, near Owatonna.  The community is located along SE 44th Avenue near SE 18th Street.

History
Havana was platted in 1867, when the Winona and St. Peter Railroad was extended to that point. The community was named after Havana, Illinois. A post office was established at Havanna in 1869, and remained in operation until 1911.

References

Unincorporated communities in Steele County, Minnesota
Unincorporated communities in Minnesota